This is a timeline of Israeli history, comprising important legal and territorial changes and political events in Israel and its predecessor states, along with important events which influenced the Zionist movement. To read about the background to these events, see History of Israel. For events predating the Zionist movement, see Timeline of Palestine.

19th century

20th century

21st century

See also 
History of Israel
List of timelines
List of years in Israel
Outline of Israel
Timeline of Jewish history
Timeline of the Arab–Israeli conflict
Timeline of the Palestine region

References 

 
Lists of events in Israel
Israel